Richard Flynn (born 13 May 1933) is an Irish sports shooter. He competed in the mixed trap event at the 1976 Summer Olympics.

References

1933 births
Living people
Irish male sport shooters
Olympic shooters of Ireland
Shooters at the 1976 Summer Olympics
Place of birth missing (living people)
20th-century Irish people